The Catholic Diocese of Tudela was a modern Latin bishopric with see in Tudela, Navarre, northern Spain, which existed 1783-1851 and again 1889-1956, each time being split off from the Pamplona see or reunited with it.

History 
 Established on 1783.03.27 as Diocese of Tudela / Tudelen(sis) (Latin), on territory split off from the Roman Catholic Diocese of Pamplona.
 Suppressed on 1851.09.05, territory and title merged (back) into the henceforth Diocese of Pamplona–Tudela.
 Restored on 1889.07.17 as Diocese of Tudela / Tudelen(sis) (Latin), split off again from Diocese of Pamplona–Tudela. It has often been vacant except for an apostolic administrator.
 On 1984.08.11 it was again effectively suppressed, but formally in personal union (aeque principaliter) with Pamplona y Tudela, so it kept its cathedral, which was not even relegated to co-cathedral.

Episcopal ordinaries

Bishops of Tudela
 Francisco Ramón Larumbre (25 June 1784 – 1 September 1796, died)
 Simón Casaviella López (24 July 1797 – 30 March 1816, died)
 Juan Raimundo Santos Larumbe y Larrayoz (14 April 1817 – 3 October 1818)
 Ramón María Azpeitia de y Sáenz de Santamaria (29 March 1819 – 31 January 1844, died)
On 5 September 1851, Diocese of Tudela was suppressed, and its territory merged to the Diocese of Pamplona-Tudela

Apostolic administrators of Tudela
The Diocese of Tudela was restored on 17 July 1889. No Bishop was appointed, and it was headed by Apostolic Administrators.
 Juan Soldevilla y Romero (17 July 1889 – 16 December 1901), Bishop of Tarazona
 José Maria Salvador y Barrera (16 December 1901 – 14 December 1905), Bishop of Tarazona
 Santiago Ozcoidi y Udave (14 December 1905 – 9 October 1916), Bishop of Tarazona
 Isidoro Badía y Sarradel (27 June 1917 – 1 October 1926), Bishop of Tarazona
 Isidro Gomá y Tomás (20 June 1927 - 12 April 1933), Bishop of Tarazona
 Nicanor Mutiloa e Irurita, C.SS.R. (1 May 1935 – 19 November 1946), Bishop of Tarazona
 Manuel Hurtado y García (24 April 1947 – 2 September 1955), Bishop of Tarazona
 Enrique Delgado y Gómez (2 September 1955 – 23 July 1968), Metropolitan Archbishop of Pamplona 
 Arturo Tabera Araoz, C.M.F. (23 July 1968 – 4 December 1971), Metropolitan Archbishop of Pamplona
 José Méndez Asensio (3 December 1971 – 31 January 1978), Metropolitan Archbishop of Pamplona 
 José María Cirarda Lachiondo (31 January 1978 – 11 August 1984), Metropolitan Archbishop of Pamplona

On 11 August 1984, the Diocese of Pamplona was united aeque principaliter with the Metropolitan Archdiocese of Pamplona.

See also 
 List of Catholic dioceses in Spain, Andorra, Ceuta and Gibraltar

Sources and external links 
 GCatholic, with Google satellite photo

Former Roman Catholic dioceses in Spain